Forty Love is the seventh studio album from Australian pop singer Anthony Callea.It was released on 21 October 2022 and peaked at number 5 on the ARIA Charts.

Upon announcement, Callea said "This album celebrates my 40 years in this life, yeah I can't believe it either! It feels like nothing else I have ever released, it's entirely me expressed through music which I am so proud of. It celebrates and appreciates the love and happiness I am fortunate to have, whilst also taking stock of the unpredictability and highs and lows of life. It is my DNA carved and molded into music and lyrics and I truly hope it resonates with people for its stories and its pop melodies as we all navigate this thing called life!"

Track listing

Charts

References

2022 albums
Anthony Callea albums